Antonio Ricardo Jardim Libório (born July 13, 1967) is a Brazilian jiu jitsu black belt under Grand Master Carlson Gracie. He is the co-founder of American Top Team (ATT) and Brazilian Top Team (BTT), the founder and CEO of Martial Arts Nation and the International Brazilian Jiu-Jitsu Institute (IBJJI), and also a professor of BJJ at the University of Central Florida.

According to Fight! magazine's most recent "Power 20", which profiles the twenty "most significant power players, movers, shakers, ambassadors, and game-changers in MMA," Libório is currently ranked #13.

He was nominated as "Coach of the Year" for the Fighters Only World Mixed Martial Awards in 2009.

Brazilian jiu-jitsu career

Antônio Ricardo Jardim Libório was born on July 13, 1967, in Rio de Janeiro, Brazil. His introduction to combat sports began at the age of 4, when he began studying judo. He later took up a variety of traditional and modern martial arts, including taekwondo, Muay Thai and boxing. At 14, he began training in Brazilian jiu-jitsu at the Carlson Gracie academy in Copacabana, Rio de Janeiro, which produced black belts such as Vitor Belfort, André Pederneiras, Walid Ismail, Mario Sperry and Ricardo de la Riva. Libório received his black belt from Carlson Gracie in 1993 at the age of 26.

In 1996, Libório entered the first ever "Mundials," or World Jiu-Jitsu Championship, winning a gold medal in the super heavyweight (super-pesado) division over Leo Castello Branco, a much heavier opponent. He was awarded the title of "Most Technical Black Belt" in that tournament. The next year, Libório competed in the International Masters Mundials under his middle name, Antônio Jardim, taking gold in the meio-pesado (middle-heavy) division. He gained renown as a jiu-jitsu player, leading Carlson to claim he could beat the legendary Rickson Gracie in a sport jiu-jitsu bout.

Mixed martial arts career
Ricardo co-founded Brazilian Top Team in collaboration with three other Carlson Gracie students, Murilo Bustamante, Luis Duarte, and Mario Sperry.

In 2001 Ricardo was approached by American businessman and Brazilian Jiu Jitsu practitioner, Dan Lambert. Dan recruited Ricardo, and together they formed a partnership, which would eventually become American Top Team.

Libório had his own MMA debut against Pancrase wrestler Ikuhisa Minowa for Japanese promotion Deep the same year. In a bout with almost no strike thrown between the contendants, Libório opened the first round struggling to take Minowa down, but he gained half mount for a while and threatened him with an armbar, which Minowa returned with a standing kimura attempt. Ricardo dominated an uneventful second round, resuming his domain the top position and almost locking a rear naked choke at its end, and he would go on to trade submissions with the Japanese wrestler at the third and last round, being still entangled in a leglock exchange when the bell rang. As the match was stipulated to be without judges, it went to a draw.

Mixed martial arts record

|-
| Draw
| align=center| 0–0-1
| Ikuhisa Minowa
| Draw
| Deep - 1st Impact
| 
| align=center| 3
| align=center| 5:00
| Nagoya, Japan
|

ADCC Superfight 
On August 29, 2015, Libório fought former Carlson Gracie teammate, Mario Sperry, in the ADCC Submission Wrestling World Championship "Superfight." After 20 minutes and two overtime periods, the referees awarded the decision to Libório.

After ATT

Martial Arts Nation 
After Leaving ATT in 2015, Libório founded Martial Arts Nation in 2018. The martial arts firm specializes in consulting, events, licensing, and branding for BJJ and other martial arts. The company's primary focus is to create sustainable programs that teach character education, leadership, and well-being with their martial arts curriculum. Additionally, the founder of MA Nation is very focused on fostering an inclusive and welcoming culture inside every MA Nation training facility.

University of Central Florida (UCF) 
Libório has made an impact at the University of Central Florida (UCF) through his BJJ club structure, classes, and events. Master Libório, in August 2018, came to UCF and helped restructure the UCF MMA club and transformed it into a BJJ club through a new organizational system and welcoming culture. At the end of 2018, the club had 30 members. By 2020, the club had 250 members, was the largest sports club at UCF, and had the second-highest female participation rate out of all other sports clubs.

On August 26, 2019, he created the first BJJ college class to be offered by a university in the U.S. from a world champion and coach. In 2020, Libório continued by adding a level 2 intermediate class to the establish beginner class schedule. His classes and club have reached hundreds of students.

In March 2018, Librio, through the International Brazilian Jiu-Jitsu Institute (IBJJI), sponsorship of Martial Arts Nation, and affiliation with the Institute of Sports and Social Justice at UCF, hosted the first Florida collegiate Jiu-Jitsu in-state competition Resenha or "hangout" event. The event focused on getting people who usually are fans off the stands and participating in Brazilian Jiu-Jitsu. Furthermore, essential topics of the event included learning more about the sport's mental and physical benefits, including helping with self-defense, anxiety, depression, focus, and self-confidence through a "Mat and Chat" system developed by Libório. In total, over 350 people participated, and 85 Black Belts from across the U.S. came to the event.

Orange County Public Schools (OCPS) 
In 2018 Libório founded an after school Martial Arts program with aims for its implementation throughout the U.S. He partnered with OCPS to create the first afterschool martial arts program in Orange county Florida at Edgewater Highschool, through Martial Arts Nation, with an emphasis on BJJ. Márcio Pimentel was the lead coach of the program, and Professor Kyle Leisher is currently the head administrator of the club at Edgewater.

BJJ is the primary sport of this project; however, other martial arts are now being taught as well, such as Judo, grappling, and self-defense. Like many other programs Libório has founded, the focus of this project centers around building self-confidence, character education, raising self-esteem, and particularly for high school students, anti-bullying education. Teaching how BJJ can positively impact a person in his or her everyday life, not just in competition, is also a central element of the OCPS program. The Edgewater program has seen year after year growth since its inception due to its organizational structure, welcoming culture, and MA nation sponsorship.

Work with the visually impaired
After craniosynostosis rendered Libório's daughter visually impaired at 1½ years old, he developed a community outreach program through American Top Team. The academy is certified to teach judo to visually impaired students.

Championships and accomplishments
Three time Brazilian National Champion
IBJJF World Champion 1996
3rd Abu Dhabi Submission Tournament 1999
2nd Abu Dhabi Submission Tournament 2000
World Champion Masters Division 2000
 NAGA Coach of the year in 2005
National Coach for USA Grappling
Inducted into the NAGA Grappling Hall of Fame 2005
Voted most technical brazilian jiu-Jitsu competitor in 2006 Mundial
Worked with the Wounded Warrior Project and U.S. Navy Seals
USA Grappling Honors Award recipient 2009
Inducted into the official World Grappling Hall of Fame 2010
Inducted into the Broward County Sports Hall of Fame 2010
ADCC 2015 Superfight Champion masters def Mario Sperry
2016 Rio de Janeiro international Olympic supervisor for judo and wrestling
Palm Sports Abu Dhabi Honors award recipient 2018
Martial Arts Industry Association Honors award recipient 2019

References

Brazilian male mixed martial artists
Mixed martial artists utilizing judo
Mixed martial artists utilizing Brazilian jiu-jitsu
Brazilian practitioners of Brazilian jiu-jitsu
People awarded a black belt in Brazilian jiu-jitsu
Brazilian male judoka
1967 births
Living people
People from Coconut Creek, Florida
World Brazilian Jiu-Jitsu Championship medalists
Sportspeople from Rio de Janeiro (city)